Trap for Seven Spies is a 1966 Italian-Spanish international co-production spy film written and directed by Mario Amendola and starring Yvonne Bastien, Eduardo Fajardo and Carlo Giuffré. It has been described as a Eurospy variation of The Most Dangerous Game.

Plot
After the end of World War II former SS Colonel Von Rittenau resides in a French castle with a group of New Nazis.  Von Rittenau captures seven former Allied secret agents after he discovers their names in an old Gestapo archive and now wants his revenge on them.

Cast 

 Yvonne Bastien as Micaela 
 Eduardo Fajardo as  Colonel Von Rittenau 
 Mirko Ellis as  Hampstead
 Mila Stanic as  Nadia 
 Carlo Giuffré as  Castellotti 
 Lucio De Santis as  Bertrand 
 Piero Morgia as Von Rittenau's nazi
 Bruno Cirino as French policeman

References

External links

1966 films
1960s spy thriller films
Italian spy thriller films
Spanish spy thriller films
Films directed by Mario Amendola
Films with screenplays by Mario Amendola
1960s Italian films
1960s Spanish films